Nasir Hossain is a first-class and List A cricketer from Bangladesh who played for Sylhet Division between 2002/03 and 2003/04. His best performance was a remarkable spell of 5 for 8, opening the bowling against Chittagong Division in a one-day match in 2002.  Chittagong were bowled out for just 30, with Rezaul Haque taking 4 for 20, and Sylhet Division knocked off the runs they needed in just 6.2 overs.  This is one of the shortest one day games on record, lasting just 26 overs and a ball in all.

References

Bangladeshi cricketers
Sylhet Division cricketers
Living people
Year of birth missing (living people)